The Field Marshal (German: Der Feldmarschall) is a 1927 German silent war drama film directed by Romano Mengon and starring Cilly Feindt, Paul Rehkopf, Harry Hardt. The film's sets were designed by art director August Rinaldi.

Cast
In alphabetical order
 Cilly Feindt 
 Harry Gondi 
 Harry Hardt 
 Manja Keller 
 Arnold Korff 
 Paul Rehkopf 
 Luise Werckmeister

References

Bibliography
 Grange, William. Cultural Chronicle of the Weimar Republic. Scarecrow Press, 2008.

External links 
 

1927 films
1927 war films
1927 drama films
Films directed by Romano Mengon
Films of the Weimar Republic
German war drama films
German silent feature films
German black-and-white films
Silent war drama films
1920s German films
1920s war drama films
1920s German-language films